The Hindi Wikipedia is the Hindi language edition of Wikipedia. It was launched in July 2003. In October 2021, there were 72 million page views. It is the first Wikipedia to be written in a variety of Hindustani, followed by the Urdu Wikipedia, launched in January 2004. On 30 August 2011, Hindi Wikipedia became the first South Asian-language Wikipedia to surpass 100,000 articles.

Hindi, using the Devanagari script, requires complex transliteration aids to be typed on devices. Thus, a Phonetic Roman Alphabet converter is also available on the Hindi Wikipedia, so the Roman keyboard can be used to contribute in Hindi, without having to use any special Hindi-typing software.

Hindi Wikipedia is the second most popular Wikipedia in India after the English version. However, more than 85% of Wikipedia pageviews from India are to English Wikipedia. Between January 2016 and January 2021 the share of Hindi Wikipedia increased from 2% to 8%. On average, Hindi Wikipedia receives 50 to 70 million monthly pageviews as of December 2022, mostly from India.

Hindi fell from 15.2 thousand active users in 2020 to 12.2 thousand in 2021. In 2022 the decrease in the number of users with at least one edit in this year continued, although at a much reduced pace. In the last four months of 2022 the number of active users in Hindi began to grow again.

Features 
Despite the fact that Hindi has 440 to 620 million speakers, based on the 2011 Census of India (the number depends on which definition we take), Hindi Wikipedia has a very low ratio of articles to its number of speakers. Poverty, lack of awareness and lack of internet access are among the reasons for this. Based on research published by the Wikimedia Foundation in 2018, only 32% of internet users in Madhya Pradesh have heard of Wikipedia.

Given the great geographic spread of the Hindi language, the contributors to the Hindi project live in various areas around the country. There are also prolific users whose native language is not Hindi, as Hindi is a government language in India alongside English. A distinct trend that is observed in Hindi is that for many years, apart from a few dedicated contributors, the composition of the editors in Hindi Wikipedia changes often. Despite this, Hindi has more active users than any other Indic language. Hindi Wikipedians have organised the WikiSammelan conference, with assistance from the Wikimedia Foundation, in order to bring the Hindi Wikipedians together.

Attempted state support 
In September 2019, the Ministry of Science and Technology of India announced a plan to translate articles about science from English to Hindi and other Indian languages. However, the plan was not proceeded with.

Google Translator Toolkit usage 
The Hindi Wikipedia was launched on 11 July 2003. In July 2008, Google announced that they had been working with Hindi Wikipedians to translate English language articles into Hindi and had since 2008 translated 600,000 words in Hindi using a combination of Google Translate and manual checking. This coordinated translation contributed to growth for the site.

Users and editors

References

External links

Wikipedia
Wikipedia
Internet properties established in 2003
Languages on Wikipedia
Wikipedias by language
Wikipedia in India